Bijoy Chandra Barman is an Indian politician who served as Chairman of Siliguri Jalpaiguri Development Authority and a former member of parliament to the 16th Lok Sabha from Jalpaiguri (Lok Sabha constituency), West Bengal. He won the 2014 Indian general election being an All India Trinamool Congress candidate.

References

India MPs 2014–2019
Living people
1957 births
People from Jalpaiguri district
Lok Sabha members from West Bengal